The Pittsburgh Comicon, later known as Wizard World Comic Con Pittsburgh and since succeeded by Steel-City Con, was a comic book convention held in Monroeville, Pennsylvania, United States. It was founded in 1994 by Michael and Renee George. It was traditionally a three-day event (Friday through Sunday) and featured a fan-friendly experience that allowed the fans to interact with comic professionals at all levels.

Though it primarily focused on comic books, the convention featured a large range of pop culture elements, such as professional wrestling, science fiction/fantasy, film/television, animation, anime, manga, toys, collectible card games, video games, webcomics, and fantasy novels. Given Pittsburgh's connection to George A. Romero's zombie apocalypse films (with Romero's Dawn of the Dead being filmed in the Monroeville Mall), horror fans were also welcomed at the convention to meet and greet with the film's actors that regularly attended.

The show also made a concerted effort to promote local-area talent and publishers. The show raised money for various charities; over the years the show had supported local literacy organizations, the Comic book Legal Defense Fund, local Food Banks, and had raised more than $250,000 for the Pittsburgh chapter of the Make-A-Wish Foundation.

History 

Windber, Pennsylvania-based comics retailers Michael and Renée George (proprietors of Comics World) staged the first Pittsburgh Comicon in April 1994 at the Radisson Hotel Pittsburgh ExpoMart in Monroeville. It was the first major show staged in Pittsburgh for the comic community since the 1970s.  From the beginning, a major focus for the show has been giving to charity, the Make-A-Wish Foundation in particular, which is the primary beneficiary of the Annual Comicon Auction.

The Pittsburgh Comicon hosted the Harvey Award ceremonies from 2000–2002, with Evan Dorkin serving as master of ceremonies. Jeff Smith was the keynote speaker of the 2000 awards. Superstar creator Frank Miller gave the keynote speech at the 2001 award ceremony in which he vilified the comic book speculating industry, in particular Wizard magazine. He ended his speech by tearing up a copy of Wizard. Tony Millionaire gave the keynote speech at the 2002 awards ceremony. In 2003, due to a cancellation from scheduled keynote speaker Neil Gaiman, funding shortages forced a cancellation of that year's Harvey Awards ceremony and banquet (which had also been scheduled for the Pittsburgh Comicon), although award-winners were still named.

The 2000 edition of the show raised $26,000 for the Pittsburgh chapter of the Make-A-Wish Foundation. The 2003 show raised $27,000 for the Make-A-Wish Foundation. The 2007 show raised $30,000 for the Make-A-Wish Foundation and $5,000 for the Comic Book Legal Defense Fund.

In 2006, Comic Geek Speak was named the Official Comics Podcast for the Pittsburgh Comicon and has held that title ever since.

In 2009, the show moved from the defunct Pittsburgh ExpoMart to the new Monroeville Convention Center, welcoming Stan Lee as their guest of honor to inaugurate their first show in the new venue.

In 2015, Pittsburgh Comicon was acquired by Wizard World, becoming Wizard World Comic Con Pittsburgh. In addition, the convention moved to the David L. Lawrence Convention Center in Pittsburgh. Wizard World held the convention there for two years, but did not hold one in 2017 or 2018. The convention returned to Pittsburgh in 2019.

After the 2019 show, the official website URL, PittsburghComicon.com, redirected to the Steel City Con, held at the Monroeville Convention Center, leading to the assumption that the Pittsburgh Comicon was defunct.

Dates and locations

Events
Along with panels, seminars, and workshops with comic book professionals, there were previews of upcoming feature films, portfolio review sessions with top comic book and video game companies, and such evening events as a costume contest,  featuring dedicated cosplayers who put great effort into their costumes and props. Traditional events included gaming and hours of other programming on all aspects of comic books and pop culture.

One popular annual event was the Comic Book Legal Defense Fund Quick-Sketch, which usually raised between $5,000 to $6,000 per show. Other charity events taking place during the Pittsburgh Comicon were the annual "Casino Night," and various drawings and donations from attendees. These events benefited such charities as The Hero Initiative and local food banks.

Like most comic-book conventions, the Pittsburgh Comicon featured a large floorspace for exhibitors. These included media companies such as movie studios and TV networks, as well as comic-book dealers and collectibles merchants. Like most comics conventions, the Pittsburgh show included an autograph area, as well as the Artists' Alley where comics artists could sign autographs and sell or do free sketches. Despite the name, Artists' Alley could include writers and even glamour models.

Charity
The Pittsburgh Comicon supported many charities through its fund raising efforts.  The primary charity of the Comicon was the Make-A-Wish Foundation.  Since the show's inception, the Comicon had raised enough funds to fulfill a number of wishes.  The show's Annual Charity Auction was main fundraising event during the show for this charity.  It had been privileged over the years to be the recipient of the works of many of our talented guests willing to provide artwork and other items to be auctioned off to benefit this deserving charity.

The Comicon also held 'Charity Quick Sketch' events featuring numerous guests that volunteered to attend the hour-long events and provide original art, usually created in front of a live audience, for the event.  During the event, raffle tickets could be purchased by attendees for a sum, which was donated to the charity featured at the event, and each piece of art created during the event was raffled off by picking a ticket from those sold.

Gallery

References

External links 
 

Comics conventions in the United States
Defunct multigenre conventions
Defunct gaming conventions
Defunct science fiction conventions in the United States
Recurring events established in 1994
Culture of Pittsburgh
Tourist attractions in Pittsburgh
1994 establishments in Pennsylvania
Conventions in Pennsylvania